The 1956 UC Santa Barbara Gauchos football team represented Santa Barbara College during the 1956 NCAA College Division football season.

Santa Barbara competed in the California Collegiate Athletic Association (CCAA). The team was led by first-year head coach Ed Cody, and played home games at La Playa Stadium in Santa Barbara, California. They finished the season with a record of five wins and five losses (5–5, 1–1 CCAA). At the end of the season, but Gauchos accepted an invitation to play in a charity bowl game. The game was the first and only Citricado Bowl, played at Escondido High School in Escondido, California against a military team from Marine Corps Recruit Depot San Diego.

Schedule

Notes

References

Santa Barbara
UC Santa Barbara Gauchos football seasons
Santa Barbara Gauchos football